The Sacramento Valley and Eastern Railway (SV&E) was a railway company that operated in Shasta County, California, from 1908 to the early 1930s.

History 

From 1908 to the early 1930s, the town of Pitt (now under Shasta Lake) was the terminus for the standard gauge Sacramento Valley and Eastern Railway, which extended on the Southern Pacific  up the Pitt River northeast to the town of Delmar. The decline in copper prices and lack of revenue led to the close of the railroad

DeLamar Railroad
The Bully Hill and Squaw Creek areas of Shasta County had been worked for gold in the 1850s and 1860s and quartz in the 1880s, the more precious of the region's mineral sources. In July 1899, a colorful New York financier, Captain Joseph Raphael De Lamar, purchased the Bully Hill mines for about $200,000 and set about building a smelter if 400 ton capacity and developing the area for copper. A 30" gauge railroad (1.5 miles long) was used to connect level 3 of the mine with the smelter, was installed at the same time, utilizing a diminutive shay bought new for the project which became informally known as the DeLamar Railroad. The smelting plant began operation in 1901. 
 
In 1901 DeLamar built an electrolytic refinery in Chrome, New Jersey, the product of the Bully Hill smelter in the form of flat ingots of blister copper and was shipped to New Jersey for refining. This was the first operation in the Bully Hill area that met with any kind of success. However a major setback was the lack of good transportation. Freight was hauled in and out by wagons on crude dirt roads over Bear Mountain Summit,  to the railhead of the Anderson and Bella Vista Railroad at Bella Vista.

Construction and opening
Copper Prices were rising and the property looked attractive enough to the General Electric Company of New York, who purchased it in 1905 and continued to operate the smelter at capacity. To alleviate the transportation problem, General Electric commenced grading in 1907 on the Sacramento Valley and Eastern Railway. Sometime in 1908, the  railroad was open to the public and to recover some of the initial investment in its construction, full freight and passenger service was offered. A new 2-6-2T tank engine was ordered from Baldwin Locomotive Works in Pennsylvania that same year, although a leased SP 4-4-0 was used to open the line.

Operation
The railroad was started quite late in the "copper boom" and the railway's fortunes turned after two years. The open roasting of the ores prior to smelting, necessary because of the high sulfur content, released clouds of smoke and toxic fumes, which had disastrous effects on any plant life that came in contact with it. In July 1910, following the filing of a suit by the U.S. government regarding damage being done to the nearby national forests, the Bully Hill smelter was closed down, never to be revived by General Electric. The cost if installing mechanical roasters was to costly in light of the now declining copper prices.
 
Meanwhile, the SV&E continued providing a service with a "skunk" gasoline motor car being used in later years to carry passengers, mail and express from Pitt out on the line. While the smelter business was shaky, there was at least a less-than-carload business of sorts with milk, farm equipment, papers, and hay being handled by the line.
 
In 1917, Walter Arnstein, president of the Oakland and Antioch Railroad, and owner of the Nevada County Narrow Gauge, secured a long-term lease and the mining of copper and zinc resumed. DeLamar's original 30" gauge railroad was utilized to transfer the ore to DeLamar where it was loaded onto standard gauge cars and shipped via the Sacramento Valley and Eastern and the Southern Pacific to the Mammoth Smelter at Kennet (now under Shasta Lake). Smelting operations were revived at Bully Hill in early 1920, only to be stopped again following declining prices in 1922.
 
A material known as Shasta zinc oxide was produced, which was an ingredient in paint and rubber tires among other things. The final product was shipped out via SV&E and SP to San Francisco where it was placed on a steam ship to be sent to Baltimore.

Decline and abandonment 
Following steady declines in copper and zinc prices in 1927, the Bully Hill operation was shut down once again and the SV&E became idle.  The Sacramento Valley & Eastern was not listed in the 1930 Official Guide of the Railways and was abandoned entirely following the collapse of the bridge across the Sacramento River just east of Pitt during the floods of early 1939. 
 
Today no trace of the right of way remains since having been submerged under the waters of Shasta Lake in the early 1940s.

References 

 
 

Railway companies established in 1908
1930s disestablishments
Defunct California railroads
Transportation in Shasta County, California
1908 establishments in California